St. Joseph Cemetery is a cemetery located in Swedesboro, New Jersey, US. It was built by the now defunct St. Joseph Church (which was established in the 1860s).

References

External links
 
 

Cemeteries in Gloucester County, New Jersey